Trow is a surname. Notable people with the surname include: 

Ann Trow, American abortionist
Bob Trow (1926–1998), American radio personality and actor
Brian Trow, financier
George W. S. Trow (1943–2006), American essayist, novelist, playwright, and media critic
James Trow (1826–1892), Canadian businessman and politician
John Fowler Trow (1810–1886), American printer and publisher
M. J. Trow (born 1949), Welsh writer
Phil Trow, English radio broadcaster

See also
Ernest Trow Carter, organist and composer